Raven Explorer may refer to:
Raven Explorer I, a single seat American autogyro
Raven Explorer II, a two-seat American autogyro